Natalie Benjamin-Lewis (born 25 May 1982) is a Welsh middle distance athlete from Cardiff, Wales. She specialises in the 1500 metres. She has represented Wales at the Commonwealth Games in Manchester 2002 and Melbourne 2006. She won the Amateur Athletic Association's indoor title over 1500 m in 2002.

Lewis married Welsh sprinter Timothy Benjamin in November 2007.

Personal bests

All information taken from IAAF profile.

External links

Living people
1982 births
Sportspeople from Cardiff
Welsh female middle-distance runners
Athletes (track and field) at the 2002 Commonwealth Games
Athletes (track and field) at the 2006 Commonwealth Games
Commonwealth Games competitors for Wales